Leonid Grigoryev (born 17 August 1926) was a Soviet athlete. He competed in the men's long jump at the 1952 Summer Olympics.

References

External links

1926 births
Possibly living people
Athletes (track and field) at the 1952 Summer Olympics
Soviet male long jumpers
Olympic athletes of the Soviet Union